Callicarpa erioclona is a species of beautyberry native to Vietnam, Borneo, Sulawesi, Java, Philippines, New Guinea and the Bismarck Archipelago. It produces small berries that grow in tight clusters. The fruit is edible, but is not commercially grown or sold in markets. The flowers are light-pink to white. The leaves can be mixed with coconut oil to treat open wounds.

References

External links
 Plants for Use  has information on Callicarpa erioclona

erioclona
Flora of Vietnam
Flora of Malesia
Flora of Papuasia
Plants described in 1847